Bhayankavu Bhagavathi Temple is a very sacred Hindu Bhagavathi temple on the Alathiyoor Pallikadavu Road in Kavilakkad,  Purathur, Tirur situated in Malappuram district, about 14 km from Tirur Railway Station .

The temple is dedicated to the goddess Bhagavathi. Three main festivals are celebrated in Bhayankavu. The first one is on Thulam 1st (the middle of the month of October). The second one is known as 'Makarachovva' (first Tuesday of Malayalam month 'Makaram'.) The annual Thalappoli ritual in the temple is observed according to the Malayalam calendar                                                

During the 'Thalappoli' festival the ritual 'Pavakkooth' (a shadow play like as doll-play, but where only the shadows of different characters of Hindu deities can be seen) is conducted in the temple throughout the month of 'Kumbam' (normally 16 February to 15 March). During these days, "Kalamezhuthu" is conducted in the Temple.The next Thalappoli is on 14 March 2022

The coloured powders used for the kalam are prepared from natural products only. The pigments are extracted from plants - rice flour (white), charcoal powder (black), turmeric powder (yellow), powdered green leaves (green), and a mixture of turmeric powder and lime (red). It often takes more than two hours to finish a kalam drawing with appealing perfection. Decorations like a canopy of palm fronds, garlands of red hibiscus flowers and thulasi or Ocimum leaves are hung above the kalam. Also during the festival, women carry lighted lamps and move in a procession to the temple for peace and prosperity. Normally, hundreds of devotees participate to witness this important ritual in the temple.

References 

Hindu temples in Malappuram district
Bhagavathi temples in Kerala